Megachile megachiloides is a species of bee in the family Megachilidae. It was described by Alfken in 1942.

References

Megachiloides
Insects described in 1942